Hubard is a surname. Notable people with the surname include:

Edmund W. Hubard (1806–1878), American politician and appraiser
William James Hubard (1807–1862), British artist

See also
 Hubbard (disambiguation)